The tarbagan marmot (Marmota sibirica) is a species of rodent in the family Sciuridae. It is found in China (Inner Mongolia and Heilongjiang), northern and western Mongolia, and Russia (southwest Siberia, Tuva, Transbaikalia). In the Mongolian Altai Mountains, its range overlaps with that of the Gray marmot. The species was classified as endangered by the IUCN in 2008.

Two subspecies are recognized:
 M. s. sibirica
 M. s. caliginosus

As a game animal
The tarbagan marmot has been eaten for centuries in the native cuisine of Mongolia, and in particular in a local dish called boodog. The meat is cooked by inserting hot stones, preheated in a fire, into the abdominal cavity of a deboned marmot. The skin is then tied up to make a bag within which the meat cooks. Hunting of marmots for food is typically done in autumn when the animals are heavier since they are preparing for hibernation.

The Russian explorer Richard Maack, who encountered tarbagans in the Ingoda Valley in Siberia, described the tarbagan hunt as follows:

Hunting the tarbagan is quite difficult. It is not easy to approach to a tarbagan within a rifle shot; besides, the wary animal never goes far from its burrow, and, if it is not killed right away, always manage to hide in the burrow. In that case one needs to dig it out, which involves a lot of labor, as tarbagans' burrows are quite deep.

As a disease carrier
Epizootics of the plague occur in tarbagan marmots in northeastern China and Mongolia, such as the Manchurian plague of 1910–1911. The plague in marmots is of the pneumonic form, spread by marmots coughing. The plague can jump from marmots to humans through the bite of the tarbagan flea (Ceratophyllus silantievi), or through consumption of meat. Marmot epizootics are known to co-occur with human epidemics in the same area. Human plague epidemics in this area are largely pneumonic plague, the most deadly form of plague. In 2019, a Mongolian couple died of plague after eating raw marmot meat.

Benefits to the environment
The tarbagan marmot is known to be an ecosystem engineer as it provides various resources to other organisms. Within the landscape, tarbagan marmot burrows provide a network of basking sites for thermoregulation, feeding areas, and refuges for other species, possibly leading to a more suitable habitat and increased survivability. In addition, for raptors and carnivorous species like gray wolves and golden eagles, tarbagan marmots are a significant source of food.

References

Further reading
 Thorington, R. W. Jr. and R. S. Hoffman (2005). "Family Sciuridae". pp. 754–818 in Mammal Species of the World a Taxonomic and Geographic Reference. D. E. Wilson and D. M. Reeder eds. Johns Hopkins University Press, Baltimore.

External links
 

Marmots
Mammals described in 1862
Mammals of China
Mammals of Mongolia
Mammals of Russia
Taxa named by Gustav Radde
Taxonomy articles created by Polbot
Endangered Fauna of China